Endomychus is a genus of beetles in the family Endomychidae.

Species

Endomychus agatae Tomaszewska, 1997
Endomychus armeniacus Motschulsky, 1835
Endomychus atriceps Pic, 1932
Endomychus atricornis Tomaszewska, 1998
Endomychus atrimembris Pic, 1922
Endomychus atripes Pic, 1921
Endomychus bicolor Gorham, 1875
Endomychus biguttatus Say, 1824
Endomychus chinensis Csiki, 1937
Endomychus coccineus (Linnaeus, 1758)
Endomychus divisus Arrow, 1920
Endomychus flavus Strohecker, 1943
Endomychus foveolatus Tomaszewska, 2002
Endomychus gorhami (Lewis, 1874)
Endomychus hiranoi Sasaji, 1978
Endomychus humeralis (Pic, 1922)
Endomychus jureceki Mader, 1936
Endomychus limbatus (Horn, 1874)
Endomychus micrus Tomaszewska, 1997
Endomychus mroczkowskii Tomaszewska, 1997
Endomychus mulleri (Mader, 1955)
Endomychus nigricapitatus Tomaszewska, 2002
Endomychus nigriceps Chűjô, 1938
Endomychus nigricornis Chűjô, 1938
Endomychus nigripes Mader, 1955
Endomychus nigropiceus (Gorham, 1887)
Endomychus pakistanicus Tomaszewska, 1997
Endomychus plagiatus (Gorham, 1887)
Endomychus punctatus Arrow, 1928
Endomychus quadra (Gorham, 1887)
Endomychus rogeri Tomaszewska, 1997
Endomychus rufipes Pic, 1946
Endomychus sasajii Tomaszewska, 1998 
Endomychus sauteri Chűjô, 1938
Endomychus slipinskii Tomaszewska, 1997
Endomychus thoracicus Charpentier, 1825
Endomychus tomishimai Nakane, 1994
Endomychus violaceipennis (Mader, 1943)
Endomychus yunnani Tomaszewska, 1997

References

Endomychidae
Coccinelloidea genera